The Mesaverde Group is a Late Cretaceous stratigraphic group found in areas of Colorado,  New Mexico, Utah, and Wyoming, in the Western United States.

History
The Mesaverde Formation was first described by W.H.Holmes in 1877 during the Hayden Survey. Holmes described the formation in the northern San Juan Basin as consisting of three units, which were a "Lower Escarpment" consisting of 40 m of ledge- and cliff-forming massive sandstone; a "Middle Coal Group" consisting of up to 300 m of thick slope-forming sandstone, shale, marl, and lignite; and an "Upper Escarpment" consisting of 60 m of ledge- and cliff-forming sandstone. A.J. Collier redesignated these units in 1919 as the Point Lookout Sandstone, the Menefee Formation, and the Cliff House Sandstone, and raised the Mesaverde Formation to group rank.

The group was later traced to the greater Green River Basin, the Uintah and Piceance Basins, the Bighorn Basin, the Front Range, the Zuni Basin, the Wasatch Plateau, Wind River Basin, Washakie Basin, and the Powder River Basin. It is spectacularly exposed along the Book Cliffs of eastern Utah and western Colorado. With the recognition of the vast extent of the group, the group has been divided into formations by region, with the original Point Lookout Sandstone, Menefee Formation, and Cliff House Sandstone being restricted largely to the San Juan Basin and the Madrid, New Mexico area.

Geology
The group is a single regression-transgression sequence in its type location in the San Juan Basin, dividing the older marine Mancos Shale and younger Lewis Shale deposited in the Western Interior Seaway. The Point Lookout Sandstone represents the regression, the Menefee Formation the subsequent fluvial delta deposits, and the Cliff House Sandstone the return of the sea. In other locations, such as along the Book Cliffs, the picture is more complicated, with multiple regression-transgression sequences from tectonic activity along the Sevier mountain front. In the Cody area, the group is a simple regression sequence and remains at formation rank. Here the group is described as interbedded light gray sandstone and gray shale in the upper part; massive, light-buff, ledge-forming sandstone containing thin lenticular coal beds in the lower part.

Formations

northern Piceance Basin:
 Williams Fork Formation
 Iles Formation

southwestern Piceance Basin:
 Hunter Canyon Formation
 Mount Garfield Formation

Powder River Basin:
 Teapot Sandstone
 Parkman Sandstone

Northern San Juan Basin:
 Point Lookout Sandstone
 Menefee Formation
 Cliff House Sandstone

Southern San Juan Basin and southern New Mexico:
 Point Lookout Sandstone
 Crevasse Canyon Formation
 Gallup Sandstone

Uintah Basin:
 Tuscher Formation
 Farrer Formation
 Neslen Formation
 Sego Sandstone
 Price River Formation
 Castlegate Sandstone
 Blackhawk Formation
 Star Point Sandstone

Washakie Basin:
 Almond Formation
 Ericson Sandstone
 Rock Springs Formation
 Blair Formation

Fossils
Dinosaur remains are among the fossils that have been recovered from the group, although none have yet been referred to a specific genus. Deinosuchus has also been reported from Mesaverde outcrops in Wyoming.

See also

 List of dinosaur-bearing rock formations
 List of stratigraphic units with indeterminate dinosaur fossils

Footnotes

References
 
 
 
 
 
 
 
 
 
 
 
 
 
 
 
 
 
 
 
 

Cretaceous formations of New Mexico
Cretaceous geology of Utah
Cretaceous geology of Wyoming
Geologic groups of New Mexico
Upper Cretaceous Series of North America